The Diocese of Moldovița was a relatively short-lived (i.e. 1418–1550) Latin bishopric in the Bukovina region of present-day northeastern Romania (more specifically in Suceava County).

History 

In 1418, a Latin Diocese of Moldovita / Moldawitza / Suczawa [i.e. Suceava in Polish] / Moldavien(sis) (Latin adjective) was established in the Principality of Moldavia.

In 1550, it was suppressed, without direct successor.

Recorded incumbents were as follows:

(all Roman Rite)

probably incomplete 
Suffragan? Bishops of Moldovita 
 Pierre de Insula (1476.03.29–death 1484)
 Simon Dobriozanus (1484.11.14–death 1497)

See also 

 List of Catholic dioceses in Romania
 Orthodox Moldovița Monastery at Vatra Moldoviței

References

External links 

 GCatholic : former Latin bishopric

Former Roman Catholic dioceses in Europe
Suppressed Roman Catholic dioceses